Anthidium deceptum is a species of bee in the family Megachilidae, the leaf-cutter, carder, or mason bees.

Distribution
Bolivia
Chile
Peru

References

External links
Image

deceptum
Insects described in 1879